Devaragutta Dasara festival is a festival celebrated during Hindu festival, Dasara in Devaragutta in Kurnool, Andhra Pradesh, India. It is a violent form of celebration where people from three villages fight with long bamboo sticks. Many devotees who participate in the fight get injured.

References

Kurnool
Festivals in Andhra Pradesh